Ortheia Barnes-Kennerly (October 18, 1944 – May 15, 2015) was an American R&B and jazz singer who opened for Motown greats including Stevie Wonder and later entered the ministry.

Barnes-Kennerly recorded in the 1960s for Detroit's Mickay Records and Coral Records, a Decca Records label. While never signing with Motown Records, she opened for a number of its stars, including Wonder, Marvin Gaye and Gladys Knight. She was the sister of singer-songwriter J.J. Barnes.

Death
Barnes died in May 2015, in St. Thomas in the U.S. Virgin Islands, where she went for a performance, friend and bass player, Ralphe Armstrong told the Detroit Free Press. She had at least two strokes in recent years and died of heart failure, she was 70.

References

External links
 

1945 births
2015 deaths
American jazz singers
American women jazz singers
Singers from Detroit
Jazz musicians from Michigan
21st-century American women